The 2018–19 season was the Esteghlal Football Club's 18th season in the Iran Pro League, and their 25nd consecutive season in the top division of Iranian football. They also competed in the Hazfi Cup, and 73rd year in existence as a football club.

Players

First team squad
Players and squad numbers last updated on 6 June 2018.

Persian Gulf League Squad

2018 AFC Champions League Squad

Transfers

In

Out

Pre-season and friendlies

Competitions

Overview

Iran Pro League

Standings

Results summary

Results by round

Matches

Hazfi Cup

Super Cup

AFC Champions League

2018 AFC Champions League

Quarter-finals

2019 AFC Champions League

Group stage

Matches

Statistics

Squad statistics

† Players who left the club mid-season.

Goalscorers

1 Includes 2018 AFC Champions League, 2019 AFC Champions League.

Clean sheets

1 Includes 2018 AFC Champions League, 2019 AFC Champions League.

Disciplinary record

Bookings & sending-off

Suspensions

References

External links
 Iran Premier League Statistics
 Persian League

Esteghlal F.C. seasons
Esteghlal